Astylosternus (commonly known as night frogs) is a genus of frogs in the family Arthroleptidae. It contains 12 species found in an area spanning from Sierra Leone in West Africa to the Democratic Republic of Congo in Central Africa, with a gap in the region of Ghana.

Species 
There are 12 species:

References

External links

 
Arthroleptidae
Amphibians of Sub-Saharan Africa
Amphibian genera
Taxonomy articles created by Polbot